Wembley Arena  (originally the Empire Pool, now known as OVO Arena Wembley for sponsorship reasons) is an indoor arena next to Wembley Stadium in Wembley, London, England, used for music, comedy, family entertainment and sport. The 12,500-seat facility is London's second-largest indoor arena after The O2 Arena, and the ninth-largest in the United Kingdom.

History

The Empire Pool (also known as Empire Pool and Sports Arena) was built for the 1934 British Empire Games at Wembley, by Arthur Elvin, and originally housed a swimming pool, as reflected by its name. The pool itself was last used for the 1948 Summer Olympics. Today, the building is used for music, comedy, family entertainment and sport.

It was designed by the engineer Sir Owen Williams, without the employment of an architect. Williams built a unique structure, with cantilevers meeting in the middle, thus avoiding the need for internal pillars. He also used high quality concrete, meaning that it has aged far better than many more recent concrete buildings. The building had a reinforced concrete frame of 3 hinged arches spanning 240 feet, which was the largest concrete span of any similar structure in the world at that time.

Work on the Empire Pool began in November 1933, and it was opened on 25 July 1934 by Prince Henry, Duke of Gloucester. The swimming pool itself was 200 feet long and 60 feet wide with a removable deck for ice skating. As with the adjacent stadium, construction was supervised by R.J. Fowler, Wembley's chief building inspector. The end of the building opened up and led to sunbathing terraces and lawns. The sides had 15 massive concrete buttresses and the tops of the ends were glazed with 20 narrow window lights of increasing height from the edges to the centre.

Ice hockey was introduced to the Empire Pool in October 1934.

In October 1976, the Empire Pool was awarded Grade II Listed status, protecting it and recognising it as a building of special architectural interest, technological innovation and virtuosity. On 1 February 1978, the Empire Pool was renamed Wembley Arena.

When the venue was known as the Empire Pool, it hosted the annual NME Poll Winners Concerts during the mid-1960s. Audiences of 10,000 viewed acts like the Beatles (who performed there four times), Led Zeppelin (who played a special two night "Electric Magic" concert during their 1971 Winter Tour; the poster for the event, designed by Steve Hardcastle, sold on the night for 30p, has become a collectors item, fetching over £500 at auction),  T. Rex (whose Ringo Starr-directed documentary film Born to Boogie is centred on a 1972 concert at the Empire Pool); Genesis, David Bowie, Cliff Richard & The Shadows, the Monkees, the Hollies, Dusty Springfield, Joe Brown & the Bruvvers, the Rolling Stones, Bon Jovi, INXS and Pink Floyd (who played there on their 1974 British Winter tour and 1977 "In the Flesh" tour). The Eagles on their Hotel California 1978 tour, the Grateful Dead, Dire Straits, who played there on their "Brothers In Arms" tour in 1985 and "On Every Street" tour in 1991, Status Quo, Queen, the Who, and Dave Dee, Dozy, Beaky, Mick & Tich, were among many others. The individual performances were then finished by a famous personality joining the respective performer on stage and presenting them with their award. The Beatles were presented with one of their awards by actor Roger Moore, and Joe Brown was joined on stage by Roy Orbison who presented him with his own award. These ceremonies were filmed, recorded and later broadcast on television.

Renovation
The venue was renovated, along with Wembley Stadium, as part of the early-21st-century regeneration of the Wembley Park area. The arena was closed for fourteen months, starting in February 2005, for a refurbishment costing £35 million; events were moved to a neighbouring temporary 10,000-seat venue, the Wembley Arena Pavilion. The new arena opened to the public on 2 April 2006, with a concert by Depeche Mode. The temporary pavilion was moved to Attard, Malta, opening as the permanent Malta Fairs & Conventions Centre in December 2006.

In September 2013, it was announced that AEG Facilities had signed a 15-year contract to operate the arena.

The building was renamed The SSE Arena on 1 June 2014 after energy company SSE plc bought the naming rights to the venue for 10 years.

Returning acts

The Grateful Dead have released recordings of complete shows from 7–8 April 1972 as part of Europe '72: The Complete Recordings. The Grateful Dead also performed at Wembley Arena on 31 October 1990 as part of their fall 1990 European concert tour. Bruce Hornsby accompanied the band for this concert.

A notable attendance record was set in the early 1970s by David Cassidy in his first tour of Great Britain in 1973, when he sold out six performances in one weekend. The experience and the associated mass hysteria was documented in a TV special called "David Cassidy: Weekend At Wembley".

Queen first performed at Wembley Arena from 11 to 13 May 1978 on their News of the World Tour. They would later return on 8 to 10 December 1980 on The Game Tour, and on 4, 5, 7, and 8 September 1984 on The Works Tour.

ABBA played six sold-out concerts, from 5 to 10 November 1979. The shows were filmed by Swedish television for a documentary which was released in 2004 on DVD as ABBA in Concert. In September 2014 Universal Music released Live at Wembley Arena, featuring most of the concert of 10 November on CD, vinyl LP and digital format. After the tour, the members of the band talked about the warmth of the Wembley audience. "It was like coming home after a couple of nights," said guitarist Björn Ulvaeus. A finale from these concerts, "The Way Old Friends Do", is the closing track on ABBA's seventh studio album, Super Trouper. Vocalist Agnetha Fältskog said it was the vibe from the audience that made the track work so much better as a live performance than as a studio track.

Tina Turner is the female artist with the most shows, with 25 and with 5 at Wembley Stadium (three in 1996 and two in 2000) Cliff Richard is the male artist with the most number of shows with 61, whereas Status Quo hold the record for a rock band with 45 performances. Irish band Westlife are the pop band with most shows with 28, and comedian Lee Evans 23 performances.

Prince played 35 concerts at the venue between 1986 and 1998.

During their 1998 Spiceworld Tour the Spice Girls played a total of 8 sold-out concerts at the venue in April 1998.

2000s
Christina Aguilera performed there on 2, 3 and 5 November 2003 as part of her Stripped Tour. The shows were filmed and later released as Stripped Live in the U.K. She returned in 2006 for two shows as part of her Back to Basics Tour. She was to return to the arena in November 2019 for The X Tour.

Beyoncé performed there on 10 and 11 November 2003 as part of her Dangerously in Love Tour. Live at Wembley was filmed during these two concerts.

Pearl Jam hold the attendance record for one show, with 12,470 fans at their 2007 gig.

Madonna performed at the arena 8 times during her Confessions Tour, selling more than 80,000 tickets. The Confessions Tour was filmed during these concerts. Madonna has performed at the arena 12 times to date, selling more than 120,000 tickets.

On November 2009, Taylor Swift performed at the arena during her Fearless Tour, making her one of the youngest artists to ever headline a show at the venue.

2010s
On 14 December 2012, BIGBANG became the first South Korean boy band to perform at the Arena during their ALIVE Galaxy Tour.

On 3 August 2013, Nepathya became the first Nepalese band to perform at the Arena.

On 6 September 2015, ABS-CBN's ASAP became the First Filipino act to SSE Wembley Arena to Celebrating 20 Years of the Filipino Variety Show.

On 19 December 2015, Nightwish became the first Finnish act to headline the Arena.

On 2 April 2016, Babymetal became the first Japanese act to headline the Arena and set the record for the Arena's highest ever merchandise sales.

On 12 November 2017, the 2017 MTV Europe Music Awards ceremony was held at the arena. The event was hosted by Rita Ora and featured performances from Eminem, Demi Lovato, U2, The Killers, Kesha and more.

The Queen biopic Bohemian Rhapsody premiered at the Arena on 23 October 2018, in recognition to how Freddie Mercury and Queen performed the iconic Live Aid performance in 1985 at nearby Wembley Stadium.

On 17 November 2018, London based DJ Andy C performed a DJ set lasting five hours, the first all night event to take place in the venue's history. The event had sold out in three days six months prior.

On 22 May 2019, Blackpink became the first South Korean girl group to perform at the arena as a part of their In Your Area World Tour.

In the summer 2019, Britain's Got Talent: The Champions was filmed at the arena.

On 3 November 2019,  Burna Boy becomes the first African Artist to headline and sell out the Arena.

2020s
The 13th Global Siyum HaShas of Daf Yomi took place in January 2020, the largest of its kind in the UK. The second series of BBC One's The Wall was filmed at the venue in 2020,

ITV's The Masked Dancer was filmed here in 2021.

The 27th National Television Awards took place on 15 September presented by Joel Dommett, after being at The O2 Arena for 12 years.

Sporting events

Olympics 
During the 1948 Summer Olympics, the venue hosted the Olympic boxing, Olympic diving, Olympic swimming, and Olympic water polo events. The venue hosted Olympic badminton and Olympic rhythmic gymnastics at the 2012 Summer Olympics.

Tennis 
From 1934 until 1990, the Empire Pool / Wembley Arena was the venue for the Wembley Professional Tennis Championships which was a part of the professional Grand Slam from 1927 until 1967.

Cycling 
From the late 1960s to the late 1970s, the Skol 6-Day cycle race was held here.  An indoor velodrome of 166 metres was assembled from sections each September.  This was Britain's first indoor velodrome.  Top professional riders from the European 6-Day circuit came to London, including Eddy Merckx, Peter Post, Patrick Sercu and many others.  British riders such as World pursuit champion Hugh Porter and British Champion Tony Gowland also competed.

Ice hockey 
The Wembley Lions and Wembley Monarchs were two ice hockey teams that used the venue regularly during the 1940s, 1950s, and 1960s, while the London Lions used the venue for a season in the 1970s. Wembley also hosted the British Hockey League play-off finals weekend at the end of each season up until the league's disbandment in 1996. The arena played host to two pairs of NHL preseason games: the Chicago Blackhawks versus the Montreal Canadiens in 1992 and the Toronto Maple Leafs versus the New York Rangers in 1993.

Boxing 
The boxing World Championship bout between then champion Alan Minter and challenger Marvin Hagler, which the latter won, was held at Wembley Arena in 1980. The arena hosted the MF & DAZN: X Series 004 event for KSI vs FaZe Temperrr on 14 January 2023.

Mixed martial arts 
The arena played host to BAMMA mixed martial arts events on in May 2011 (BAMMA 6), September 2012 (BAMMA 10) and September 2017 (BAMMA 31) as well as UFC on Fuel TV: Barão vs. McDonald, in February 2013.

Other sports 
The Horse of the Year Show was held there from 1959 to 2002. From 1979 to 1983, indoor speedway was held during the winter, with the riders racing on concrete on a 181-yard track Two NBA basketball exhibition matches were played at the arena in1 October 1993, featuring the Atlanta Hawks and Orlando Magic. It hosted the final of the Premier League Darts in 2009 and 2011 as well as the 2010  playoff finals.

Esports 
The European League Of Legends Championship Series, which is a competitive esports league in the computer game League of Legends, played its round of matches at the arena in 2014. The 2015 League of Legends World Championship quarterfinals took place in the Arena. In September 2018, the playoffs for the FACEIT Major: London 2018 Counter-Strike: Global Offensive Major Championship took place in the arena.

Professional wrestling 
The venue has hosted many professional wrestling events from Joint Promotions, WWE, NXT (TakeOver: London), WCW, World Wrestling All-Stars, Impact Wrestling, and Progress Wrestling,

Square of Fame

With the reopening of Wembley Arena in 2006, a "Square of Fame" area has been created in front of the arena. Similar to the Hollywood Walk of Fame, notable Wembley Arena performers are invited to have bronze plaques imprinted with their names and handprints. The first star to have a plaque was Madonna, on 1 August 2006. On 9 November 2006, Cliff Richard added his handprints to the Square. Rick Parfitt and Francis Rossi, of Status Quo, unveiled a plaque, with one of each of their handprints, on 16 December 2006. On 9 January 2007, Kylie Minogue included her handprints, on the final day of the London leg of her Showgirl Homecoming Tour.

Seven time World Snooker Champion Stephen Hendry added his handprints on 21 January 2007. International country superstar Dolly Parton unveiled her plaque, on the final night of her UK tour, on 25 March 2007. Canadian musician Bryan Adams unveiled his plaque, on 10 May 2007, just before his 25th appearance at the venue. Just three days later, singer Lionel Richie was presented with his plaque on 13 May 2007, after another sold-out performance at the arena. Irish boyband Westlife unveiled their plaque on 28 March 2008, after 27 sell-out shows, in the space of 10 years. They have sold 250,000 tickets. All four members, Shane Filan, Nicky Byrne, Kian Egan and Mark Feehily were presented with a cast of their hands, which can also be seen in the Square of Fame. Alice Cooper added his handprints in 2012 as the only solo artist to have headlined at the venue in the past five consecutive decades.

Transport
Wembley Arena is served by Wembley Park station on the London Underground via Olympic Way, and Wembley Central station via the White Horse Bridge.

Train services are operated by Chiltern Railways from Wembley Stadium station to London Marylebone and Birmingham. London Buses routes 92 and 440 stop directly outside the arena. Wembley Central station is located nearby on High Road and is served by London Overground, London Underground, Southern and London Northwestern Railway services.

The onsite parking facility is shared with Wembley Stadium, essentially being the open-air surface parking surrounding the eastern flank of Wembley Stadium and the multistorey car park. These are called Green Car Park and Red Car Park respectively. There is disabled parking available onsite, at the Green Car Park, at a reduced rate but on a first-come, first-served basis.

See also

 List of Commonwealth Games venues

References

External links

 

 
1934 establishments in England
Venues of the 1948 Summer Olympics
Venues of the 2012 Summer Olympics
Basketball venues in England
Grade II listed buildings in the London Borough of Brent
Indoor arenas in London
Music venues completed in 1934
Music venues in London
Olympic badminton venues
Olympic boxing venues
Olympic diving venues
Olympic gymnastics venues
Olympic swimming venues
Olympic water polo venues
Snooker venues
Sports venues completed in 1934
Swimming venues in London
Tourist attractions in the London Borough of Brent
Darts venues
Boxing venues in the United Kingdom
Multi-purpose stadiums in the United Kingdom
Esports venues in the United Kingdom
Netball venues in England
Art Deco architecture in London